Leufroyia concinna is a species of sea snail, a marine gastropod mollusk in the family Raphitomidae.

Subspecies
 Leufroyia concinna maderensis (F. Nordsieck & F.F. Talavera, 1979) (synonym: Raphitoma concinna maderensis F. Nordsieck & F.F. Talavera, 1979 )

Description
The shell grows to a length of 13 mm, its diameter 6 mm

Distribution
This species occurs in European waters and in the entire Mediterranean Sea and in the NE Atlantic Ocean off the Azores up Norway and south up to Canary Islands

References

 Howson, C.M.; Picton, B.E. (Ed.) (1997). The species directory of the marine fauna and flora of the British Isles and surrounding seas. Ulster Museum Publication, 276. The Ulster Museum: Belfast, UK. . vi, 508 (+ cd-rom)
 Terlizzi, A.; Scuderi, D.; Fraschetti, S.; Anderson, M.J. (2005). Quantifying effects of pollution on biodiversity: a case study of highly diverse molluscan assemblages in the Mediterranean. Mar. Biol. 148(2): 293-305
 Gofas, S.; Le Renard, J.; Bouchet, P. (2001). Mollusca, in: Costello, M.J. et al. (Ed.) (2001). European register of marine species: a check-list of the marine species in Europe and a bibliography of guides to their identification. Collection Patrimoines Naturels, 50: pp. 180–213
 Marine Benthic Fauna List, Læsø, Denmark
 De Casa G. & Hallgass A. (1979). Osservazioni sul sottogenere Leufroyia del genere Raphitoma. Notiziario del C.I.S.MA. 1: 5-14
 Cretella, M., Crovato, C., Crovato, P., Fasulo, G. & Toscano, F., 2005. The malacological work of Arcangelo Scacchi (1810-1893). Part II: a critical review of Scacchian taxa. Bollettino Malacologico 40(9-12): 114-131

External links
 
 Scacchi, A. (1836). Catalogus Conchyliorum regni Neapolitani. Neapoli [Naples], Typis Filiatre-Sebetii 18 p., 1 pl
 Bucquoy E., Dautzenberg P. & Dollfus G. (1882-1886). Les mollusques marins du Roussillon. Tome Ier. Gastropodes. Paris, J.B. Baillière & fils 570 p., 66 pl.
 Smith J. (1839). On the last changes in the relative levels of the land and sea in the British Islands. Memoirs of the Wernerian Natural History Society (Edinburgh) 8: 49-113 pl. 1-2
 Fassio, G.; Russini, V.; Pusateri, F.; Giannuzzi-Savelli, R.; Høisæter, T.; Puillandre, N.; Modica, M. V.; Oliverio, M. (2019). An assessment of Raphitoma and allied genera (Neogastropoda: Raphitomidae). Journal of Molluscan Studies
 Terlizzi, A.; Scuderi, D.; Fraschetti, S.; Anderson, M. J. (2005). Quantifying effects of pollution on biodiversity: a case study of highly diverse molluscan assemblages in the Mediterranean. Marine Biology. 148, 293-305

concinna
Gastropods described in 1836